Georgian Americans are Americans of full or partial Georgian ancestry. They encompass ethnic Georgians who have immigrated to the U.S. from Georgia, as well as other areas with significant Georgian populations, such as Russia.

The precise number of Americans of Georgian descent is unknown. This is because 19th and 20th century U.S. immigration records often did not differentiate between various ethnic groups originating from the Russian Empire, which had slowly annexed Georgia starting from year 1801 and of which it remained a part until 1918.

History

Early stages of immigration
The earliest recorded Georgian immigrants to the US were the Georgian horsemen. One group came in 1890 as part of a troupe of Cossack horsemen hired by Buffalo Bill Cody and his Wild Congress of Rough Riders.

The number of Georgians coming to the U.S. saw an increase after political upheavals of the Russian Revolution forced the Georgian nobility and intellectuals, including those residing in other parts of the Russian Empire, to move to the U.S. In just several years, another wave of immigration of Georgians was triggered by the Red Army invasion of Georgia, which led to the exodus of intellectuals who were in fear of deportation and imminent death in Russian Siberia. A notable example of pre-Soviet immigration of ethnic Georgians is that of George Balanchine, whose immediate family was split between U.S. and Soviet Georgia.

Immigration during and following the Soviet Union

Emigration from Georgia was brought to a halt in the 1920s and 1930s, when the Soviet Union put in place restrictions on travel, both in and out of the Union. Despite these restrictions, some Georgians managed to flee to the U.S. during World War II. These were primarily ethnic Georgians who lived in liberated parts of Eastern Europe, as well as members of the Georgian military who were stationed or otherwise resided abroad. Such was the case with John Shalikashvili, a son of a Georgian officer, who would rise to become the Chairman of the Joint Chiefs of Staff and Supreme Allied Commander.

Following World War II, emigration from Soviet Georgia was virtually nonexistent until the collapse of the Soviet Union in 1991, after which an estimated one-fifth of Georgia's population left due to economic hardships. Unlike the first half of the 20th century, this final wave of emigration was wide-reaching and not limited to intellectuals or military personnel.

Population
There are several concentrations of Georgians throughout the United States including the New York metropolitan area (especially in Connecticut), Chicago, Portland, Oregon, San Francisco, the Washington metropolitan area, the Dallas-Fort Worth metroplex, among others. Dayton, Ohio has sizeable Meskhetian Turk population, the majority of whom are from Georgia. During the 1970s, many Georgian Jews immigrated to Brooklyn, New York.

Assimilation
Georgian-Americans created several organizations in order to maintain their culture. In 1924, organizations of Georgian-Americans were founded in the cities of San Francisco and New York. These organizations held cultural and social events, and has helped other immigrants. Between 1955 and 1975, the American press was very active in Georgia. Kartuli Azri (Georgian Opinion) was the most popular newspaper and its maintenance was based primarily on donations from Americans in Georgia. Although, over the years, Georgians have adapted to American culture, Georgian Americans still retain aspects of Georgian culture.

Some members of the Georgian-Jewish community in New York keep their ancestral Judeo-Georgian language.

Notable people
A List of Georgian Americans. The list includes American-born people of Georgian descent and immigrants to the United States who are now American citizens.

 
 Alex d'Arbeloff, entrepreneur
 George Arison, entrepreneur
 Teymuraz Bagration, nobleman, President of the Tolstoy Foundation
 George Balanchine, one of the 20th century's most famous choreographers; co-founder and balletmaster of New York City Ballet
 Valery Chalidze, author and publisher
 David Chavchavadze, author
 Lasha Darbaidze, honorary counsel of Georgia
 David Datuna, artist
 Yana Djin, poet
 Wachtang Djobadze, historian
 Vernon Duke, composer and songwriter
 Andrew Eristoff, politician
 George Finn, actor
 Gregory Gabadadze, physics professor, New York University
 Michael Gregor, aircraft engineer 
 Dimitri Jorjadze, race car driver
 Alexander Kartveli, aircraft designer of the 20th century
 Kola Kwariani, wrestler
 Giorgi Latso, classical concert pianist, composer and doctor of musical arts
 Khatuna Lorig, archer
 Georges V. Matchabelli, perfumer and a former diplomat
 George Papashvily, writer and sculptor 
 Tamir Sapir, businessman
 Yuri Sardarov, actor and producer
 Elena Satine, singer
 John Shalikashvili, general
 Othar Shalikashvili, colonel
 Regina Shamvili, classical pianist
 Constantine Sidamon-Eristoff, aristocrat
 Levan Songulashvili, artist
 Elizabeth Stone, Paralympic swimmer 
 Alexander Tarsaidze, writer and historian
 Anna Tatishvili, tennis player
 Alexander Toradze, classical concert pianist
 Cyril Toumanoff, historian and genealogist
 Jerzy Tumaniszwili, aristocrat
 George Coby, businessman, inventor and chemist

See also 

 Georgia–United States relations

References

Further reading
 
 Bridges, Peter. "Georgia and America–Early Contacts." American Diplomacy (2011). online
 Wertsman, Vladimir F. "Georgian Americans." in Gale Encyclopedia of Multicultural America, edited by Thomas Riggs, (3rd ed., vol. 2, Gale, 2014), pp. 197-206. online

External links
 Georgian Association in the United States of America
 Georgian America Foundation 
 Tvistomi Association - Georgian Community Organization in New York
 Tvistomi Medical Group, New York

American people of Georgian (country) descent
Georgian diaspora
Georgian (country) American
Middle Eastern American